Melissa Gregory (born May 22, 1981) is an American former ice dancer. With partner and husband Denis Petukhov, she is the 2005 Four Continents silver medalist, a 2006 United States Olympic team member, and a four-time (2004–07) U.S. national silver medalist.

Personal life 
Gregory was born in Highland Park, Illinois. Her father Joseph is Catholic and her mother Dale is Jewish. She has an older brother Michael.

Gregory and Petukhov met in August 2000, when he came to the United States in search of an ice dancing partner, with a list of several persons he planned to meet. Gregory was also seeking a partner then, prepared to give up skating if she could not find one. The couple found that they skated well together and began a new partnership.

They were married in Las Vegas, Nevada on February 2, 2001. The next month they flew to Kirov, Russia so that Petukhov's family could also celebrate their marriage. The couple's son, Daxton Dale Petukhov, was born on November 21, 2014. They welcomed their 2nd son Lennox William Petukhov on June 14, 2017.
Petukhov became a naturalized US citizen in 2005.

Career 
Gregory began skating at age eight. She competed in novice ladies' singles before deciding to concentrate on ice dance.

Gregory was US junior ice dance champion in 1998 with James Shuford. After being without an ice dancing partner for nearly three years, she told her coach that she would quit skating and go to college if she could not find one by September 1, 2000. She met Russian ice dancer Denis Petukhov through on an online skating-partner search. He spoke little English and so had a friend write his messages for him. He arrived in the United States on a tourist visa on August 31, 2000 to try skating with her, and several other prospective partners. After skating with Gregory first, Petukhov canceled his other tryouts and never used his return plane ticket to Russia.

Gregory and Petukhov were originally coached by Oleg Epstein and Sandy Hess. In 2003 they changed to Nikolai Morozov and Shae-Lynn Bourne. Following the 2005–06 season, they switched again to Natalia Linichuk and Gennadi Karpanosov at the University of Delaware in Newark. On September 7, 2007, they announced another coaching change, this time to Priscilla Hill at The Pond Ice Arena, also in Newark.

Gregory and Petukhov won four silver medals and two bronze medals at the U.S. Championships and competed in the 2006 Winter Olympics.

Gregory and Petukhov both suffered injuries in a fall during the warmup before the free dance at 2007 Skate Canada International on November 4, 2007. Petukhov lost his footing while practicing a one-handed rotational lift and dropped Gregory onto the ice, injuring her ribs and hip. He skidded into the boards, hurting his knee and neck. Gregory was taken to a hospital following the fall but was released that night. They were forced to withdraw from competition for the rest of the season in order to heal from their injuries.

Gregory and Petukhov did not return to competition. In 2008, they moved to Connecticut and began coaching and choreographing for other skaters. They also founded a nonprofit organization Proud Nation Inc. They also launched their own YouTube channel, OlympianUncut, focusing on a behind-the-scenes look at the skating world.

Gregory and Petukhov are successful professional show skaters. They devote much of their time to EduSkating Fever on Ice, a program they founded in 2009 that combines learn-to-skate sessions with academics; it is intended for middle-school students in Connecticut. EduSkating Fever on Ice was one of two "Rings of Gold" award winners for 2010, and Gregory was the first skater to receive the individual award for her contribution to the program. In 2014 EduSkating was designated as an official Community Olympic Development Program of The US Olympic Committee.

In 2016, Gregory and Petukhov opened a seasonal, outdoor, luxury ice rink near The World Trade Center in New York City. It is named The Rink at Brookfield Place with Gregory & Petukhov. They also coach at various rinks in Connecticut.

Programs 
(with Petukhov)

Competitive highlights
GP: Grand Prix; JGP: Junior Grand Prix

With Petukhov

With Shuford

See also
List of select Jewish figure skaters

References

External links

Official site
 
U.S. Olympic Team bio

1981 births
American female ice dancers
Figure skaters at the 2006 Winter Olympics
Jewish American sportspeople
Living people
Olympic figure skaters of the United States
Four Continents Figure Skating Championships medalists
21st-century American Jews
21st-century American women